Soyauxia talbotii is a species of plant in the Peridiscaceae family. It is endemic to Nigeria.

References

Peridiscaceae
Flora of Nigeria
Endangered plants
Taxonomy articles created by Polbot